New Nigerian Bank Football Club was a Nigerian football team that played in Benin City. Originally known as Ethiope FC and based in Sapele, it was  handed over by the Bendel State government to New Nigeria Bank and moved to Benin City in 1973.
It would disappear from the map after its corporate owners started having liquidity problems when the first wave of financial houses crashes happened in the 1980s. The team was relegated in 1989 and disbanded soon afterwards.

Achievements
Nigeria Premier League: 1
1985

West African Football Union (WAFU Cup): 2
1983, 1984

Performance in CAF competitions
African Cup of Champions Clubs: 1 appearance
1986: Second Round

Former players
 Wilfred Agbonavbare
 Stephen Keshi
 Henry Nwosu
 Humphrey Edobor
 Augustine Igbinabaro

References

Football clubs in Nigeria
Defunct football clubs in Nigeria
Association football clubs established in 1973
Benin City
Financial services association football clubs in Nigeria